Matthew Walker may refer to:

Actors

Matthew Walker (American actor) (born 1968), American actor
Matthew Walker (Australian actor) (born 1979), New Zealand-Australian actor
Matthew Walker (Canadian actor) (born 1942), English film and television actor in Canada

Sportspeople

Matthew Walker (English cricketer) (born 1974), English cricketer
Matthew Walker (New Zealand cricketer) (born 1977), cricketer from New Zealand
Matthew Walker (swimmer) (born 1978), English swimmer

Science

Matthew Walker Sr. (1906–1978), African-American physician and surgeon
Matthew Walker (scientist) (born c. 1972), professor of neuroscience and psychology

See also
Matt Walker (disambiguation)
Matthew Walker knot, a decorative knot
Robert Matthew-Walker (born 1939), English writer, broadcaster and composer